Mahmud Baksi (Mahmûd Baksî), (16 September 1944 – 19 December 2000), was a Kurdish writer and journalist. He was born in the village of Suphî in the Batman Province of Turkey. He began to publish a newspaper titled Batman Gazetesi in 1967. He became the head of the Batman branch of the Workers Party of Turkey. From 1968 to 1970, he became involved in the labor union movement of Turkey. Around the same period, he was sentenced to 15 years in prison for promoting Kurdish nationalism. In 1970, he fled to Germany and later to Sweden where he stayed until his death. He is buried in Diyarbakır. He is the uncle of Nalin Pekgul who have been active at the Swedish socialdemocratic party and journalist Kurdo Baksi.

References

1944 births
2000 deaths
Kurdish-language writers
Kurdish journalists
Turkish people of Kurdish descent